Alpha is a neighborhood in Morristown, Tennessee, United States. It is located at and around the junction of U.S. Route 11E and Tennessee State Route 160 between Morristown and Jefferson City. It was formerly a unincorporated community before being annexed into the City of Morristown.

History
A post office called Alpha was established in 1877, and remained in operation until it was discontinued in 1928.

Education
Alpha is home to Alpha Elementary School which is a part of the Hamblen County Board of Education.

References

Morristown metropolitan area, Tennessee
Neighborhoods in Tennessee